Tetraphenylborate (IUPAC name: Tetraphenylboranuide) is an organoboron anion consisting of a central boron atom with four phenyl groups.  Salts of tetraphenylborate uncouple oxidative phosphorylation.

See also
Sodium tetraphenylborate
Potassium tetraphenylborate
Triphenylborane
BARF and other fluorinated derivatives are used as non-coordinating anions.

References

 
Anions